Ford High School may refer to:

 Henry Ford High School (Detroit, Michigan), U.S.
 Edsel Ford High School, Dearborn, Michigan, U.S.
 Henry Ford II High School, Sterling Heights, Michigan, U.S.
 Ford High School, Quinlan, Texas, U.S.